Thailand participated in the 1954 Asian Games in Manila on 1–9 May 1954.

Nations at the 1954 Asian Games
1954
Asian Games